Renford Rejects is a teen sitcom produced and broadcast by Nickelodeon UK between 1998 and 2001. The show briefly aired in the United States on Nick GaS. Reruns used to be broadcast on Nickelodeon UK at 1:50am and 2:15am until 2020.

The show concerned a five-a-side school football team, made up of aspiring players who had been turned down by their school's main team. Although they originally called themselves the "Renford Rovers", they ended up being named "Renford Rejects" when a rival player sabotaged their league entry form. They decided to stick with the name as it suited their "outcast" nature. The show used to be played at night from 1:50am to 2:40am on U.K. Nickelodeon.

Filming
Series 1 was filmed in Autumn 1997, Series 2 in Autumn 1998, Series 3 in Autumn 1999, and Series 4 in Autumn 2000.

The show was filmed at Willesden Sports Centre, London, NW10 3QX. Eddie McAvoy's Gracelands Cafe was filmed at 118 College Road, Willesden, London NW10 5HD.

The 'Cafe' closed in April 2019.

Cast
The regular cast, as is often the case with teen sitcoms, went through a number of changes as its four series went by.

Main characters
 Jason Summerbee (Martin Delaney) - The team's captain, an average working-class teen who in his head was a genius player destined for the top. He is often seen wearing a Hull City jersey. He seems to be a pampered child who tends to tell lot of lies. In Season 1 when the team makes a trip to London, he starts to say lies for not go with them but everybody realize although they pretend not to notice, with Robin's help he eventually goes to London too. Also in other episode his friends bullying him for have the issue about telling lies generating a complex situation with all of them, specially with Robin. Apparently Jason have a crush on her, but when he realize that Robin manipulates him for get a ticket to a football game, he resents her, she also gets mad with him when she discovers that the ticket was not for see famous players. In season 2 Robin appears in few episodes, but both (Jason and Robin) are happy to interact with each other. The only one who seems not have problems with Jason is Stewart, who in most chapters acts as his older brother, defending and supporting him, there's a good chemistry between both.
 Stewart Jackson (Matthew Leitch) In the first two series, the team were coached by him, an upper-class older boy who had been the school team's star player until an injury (caused by Terry Stoker) prevented him from playing. He supports Chelsea and often wears Chelsea shirts. By the third series, however, he had recovered from his injury and joined as a player although he still does the training and in a few episodes that series is referred to as Player/Manager. As the series progresses he semms to be affected by the craziness of the others. He left after the 40th episode. Is the only person in Renford who recognizes the 1966 England World Cup team.
 "Bruno Di Gradi" (Paul Parris) - Real name Barry Grade, he believed he was an Azzuri superstar, and so constantly spoke in an Italian accent despite really being English. Often wears Italian football shirts and also has the ability to appear and disappear from a scene which the other Rejects never seem to recognize.
 Ben Phillips (Charlie Rolland) - The poetry-loving, bespectacled goalkeeper. Likes to wear shirts with philosophical quotes on them.
 Vinnie Rodrigues (Roger Davies) - Just as the Renford players fantasied about being great footballers, Vinnie fantasied about being a famous commentator and anchorman. He frequently presented to-camera reports on the team, and in his fantasies famous presenters such as Jim Rosenthal often appeared as his co-anchor. In one episode he plays for the Rejects and shows a lot of talent as a player but prefers to stay as a presenter.
 Eddie McAvoy (Alex Norton) - Owner of the local cafe "Graceland", and a fanatical Elvis fan, Eddie often helped out the team, and even coached them later in the series although he seems to do this on a part time basis and lets Stewart and later Dennis handle the training side of things.
 Ronnie Supra (Adam Dean) for the first two series was the fifth player. He was recognizable as always wearing the latest fashions, always combing his hair on the pitch during games and being the son of the sponsor for the team's strips - his father's firm 'Supra Drain', in which was said that Ronnie would someday work. After series two, Ronnie left the Rejects to start his own Agency, and would appear in one episode of series three to help the Rejects when their local pitch was under threat of having houses built on it.
 Robin Walker (played by Holly Davidson), who was also by far the team's most skillful player, but joined the Rejects due to not being allowed to play for the school team. Some male Rejects appear to have a crush on her, most notably on Jason and Stewart, but Robin apparent crush on Jason was just to get an invitation to a soccer game. During each of the series, the rejects had a girl playing for their team, Robin was the first. Davidson left to further her acting career at the end of the first series (Robin was written out by leaving the Rejects to play for the Chelsea ladies' team). Robin appeared in season two first episodes, and is spotted that her invitation to Chelsea ladies' team was suggested by her replacement, Sue (originally was her plan for taking Robin's place), although Robin is very grateful to Sue the rest of the team is quite upset with her (Sue) for losing their star player (Robin).
 Sue White (Lucy Punch) - Unlike Robin, Sue's lack of footballing ability was more in keeping with the rest of the Rejects team. In Season 2 Episode 1, at first she was Ben' replacement, she was goalkeeper for the match against Razor, but only to flirt with Terry whole game made this not achieve anything. Sue realize that she had no chance to get into Reject's Team but anyway she got Robin's place, and is spotted that Robin's invitation to Chelsea ladies' team was Sue's original idea. Transfers to Arctic Rangers and plays as a goalkeeper.
 Mia Smith (Megan Bertie), who outlasted her predecessors by staying for the third and fourth series. Like Sue, it seems that Mia doesn't have good skills.
 In series four, Stewart was replaced by Dennis Quayle (Mohammed George), who became the player/manager, and who successfully trained the Rejects to qualify for the European Beach Football Championships.
 Terry Stoker (Tom Weller). The Rejects' fierce enemy, played for rival team the Razors, whom father, Basil, is the coach. Terry was also responsible for giving the Rejects their name. In first season it seems that Terry has a love interest in Robin, as Jason and Stewart, but in second season he (Terry) definitely had a crush on Sue and does not interact with Robin anymore. Later he temporarily replaces Vinny on Sportview and becomes quite popular before his father and the Rejects trick him into quitting.

Supporting/Recurring Characters
 Basil Stoker (Bill Homewood) - Terry's father, was the school's football coach and had been responsible for not picking the Rejects players for his team. He was very cruel and strict. Stoker along with his son, often tried to find ways to either out do or humiliate the Rejects.
 Priscilla McAvoy (Sally Kinghorn) - Eddie's wife, whose face was always hidden from the viewers. Very jealous of Eddie's former girlfriends, particularly Gladys McPherson.
 Jim Rosenthal (Jim Rosenthal) and Bob Wilson (Bob Wilson)  - At the beginning of the series they don't know who Vinnie and the Rejects are but as the series progresses they take a keen interest in their results and will interact with Vinnie on a regular basis.

Also appearing was James Corden, who appeared in Don Bruno as Razor #1, where he, along with Terry Stoker, threatened to make Bruno eat his shirt; and Natasha Dilleyston (she appeared in "Heartbreak Hotel and "Ben In Tights"). She played Ben's "love interest" Justine. The episode "Ciao Bambino" featured EastEnders actress Leila Birch, playing Bruno's love interest Gina. Birch and Parris went on to become engaged in real life after meeting on the show.
The club trainer Leo was played by Mark Smith, who had recently left the ITV show Gladiators.

The show also featured several comedians in guest roles, including Tony Slattery ("Boyband"), David Baddiel ("Reject TV") and Alexei Sayle ("Action").

Guest stars

A number of famous guest stars from the world of football appeared as themselves throughout the course of the series. These included Ian Rush, Gianfranco Zola, Martin Keown, Shaka Hislop, Roberto Di Matteo, Jon Harley, John Terry, Kasey Keller, Harry Redknapp with the West Ham first team, Jim Rosenthal, Bob Wilson, Stan Bowles, and various members of England's 1966 World Cup-winning team.

Music

As with many similarly themed series, Renford Rejects used a popular contemporary indie song as its theme tune - in this case, "Australia" by the Manic Street Preachers.

Renford Rejects also used an edited version of Rob Dougan's Clubbed To Death (Kurayamino Mix) from his breakthrough album Furious Angels when the Rejects rivals, The Razors, would appear on screen.

"Ready to Go" by Republica and "Tubthumping" by Chumbawamba were songs often heard during a match.

"A Girl Like You" by Edwyn Collins, was the song for Robin in the first season, also "Who Do You Think You Are" by Spice Girls was Sue's song on her debut in season two.

References

External links
 

1998 British television series debuts
2001 British television series endings
Nickelodeon original programming
Fictional association football television series
Fictional association football players
1990s British teen sitcoms
2000s British teen sitcoms
1990s British children's television series
2000s British children's television series
Television series about teenagers
Television shows set in London